This is a list of places in the continent of North America which have standing links to local communities in other countries, known as "town twinning" (usually in Europe) or "sister cities" (usually in the rest of the world).

Antigua and Barbuda
St. John's
 Jersey City, United States

Aruba
Oranjestad
 Doral, United States

Bahamas
Cat Island
 Richton Park, United States

Freeport

 Concord, United States
 Winston-Salem, United States

Hope Town
 Stuart, United States

Nassau

 Detroit, United States
 Winston-Salem, United States

Barbados
Bridgetown
 Wilmington, United States

Speightstown

 Charleston, United States
 Reading, England, United Kingdom

Belize
Belize City

 Ann Arbor, United States
 Evanston, United States
 Kaohsiung, Taiwan

Belmopan
 Taipei, Taiwan

Punta Gorda
 Prairie View, United States

San Pedro

 Othón P. Blanco, Mexico
 Wilmington, United States

Bermuda
St. George's

 Jamestown, United States
 Lyme Regis, England, United Kingdom

Canada

Costa Rica
Abangares
 Ciudad Valles, Mexico

Alajuela

 Bordano, Italy
 Downey, United States
 Guadalajara, Mexico
 Huixquilucan, Mexico
 Lahr, Germany
 Montegrotto Terme, Italy
 Santos, Brazil

Belén

 Caguas, Puerto Rico
 DeLand, United States
 Nicolás Romero, Mexico
 Quezaltepeque, El Salvador
 Rivas, Nicaragua

Cañas

 Liptál, Czech Republic
 Sanxiang, China

Cartago

 Kaohsiung, Taiwan
 Masaya, Nicaragua
 Oaxaca de Juárez, Mexico
 Qinghai, China
 Zapopan, Mexico

La Cruz
 Laredo, United States

Escazú
 Pensacola, United States

Heredia

 Marietta, United States
 Santa Tecla, El Salvador

Jacó
 Aurora, United States

Liberia
 Tyler, United States

Limón
 Galați, Romania

Monteverde
 Estes Park, United States

Puntarenas

 Kesennuma, Japan
 Zhongshan, China

Quepos
 Fort Lauderdale, United States

San José

 Almaty, Kazakhstan
 Asunción, Paraguay
 Beijing, China
 Ecatepec, Mexico
 Guadalajara, Mexico
 Guangzhou, China
 Kfar Saba, Israel
 Madrid, Spain
 Mexico City, Mexico
 Miami-Dade County, United States
 Okayama Japan
 Pontevedra, Spain
 Puebla, Mexico
 Puerto Vallarta, Mexico
 Rio de Janeiro, Brazil
 Saltillo, Mexico
 San Jose, United States
 Sichuan, China
 Taipei, Taiwan

Santa Ana

 Lima, Peru
 Marianao (Havana), Cuba
 Princes' Islands, Turkey

Santa Cruz

 El Oro, Mexico
 Santa Fe, Spain

Talamanca
 Montevideo, Uruguay

Tilarán

 Durham, United States
 Liptál, Czech Republic

Turrialba
 Rancho Cordova, United States

Cuba

Dominican Republic
Los Alcarrizos
 Quartu Sant'Elena, Italy

Higüey
 Hollywood, United States

Puerto Plata
 Rochester, United States

La Romana
 Fort Lauderdale, United States

Salcedo
 Atlanta, United States

San Ignacio de Sabaneta
 Vezzani, France

Santo Domingo

 Asunción, Paraguay
 Buenos Aires, Argentina
 Caracas, Venezuela
 Guadalajara, Mexico
 A Guarda, Spain
 Madrid, Spain
 Miami-Dade County, United States
 New York City, United States
 Pontevedra, Spain
 Rio de Janeiro, Brazil
 Rosario, Argentina
 Providence, United States
 St. Augustine, United States
 Taipei, Taiwan
 Tenerife, Spain

Santiago

 Glendale, United States
 San Juan, Puerto Rico

Saona
 Savona, Italy

Sosúa
 North Miami Beach, United States

La Vega
 Borgo San Dalmazzo, Italy

El Salvador
Agua Caliente
 Concord, United States

Arcatao
 Madison, United States

Concepción de Ataco

 Elk Grove, United States
 Fountain Hills, United States

Mejicanos
 Guarulhos, Brazil

Nahulingo
 Montcada i Reixac, Spain

Nejapa
 Coslada, Spain

Quezaltepeque
 Belén, Costa Rica

San Agustín
 Préizerdaul, Luxembourg

San Antonio Los Ranchos
 Berkeley, United States

San José Las Flores
 Cambridge, United States

San Miguel
 Arlington County, United States

San Pedro Masahuat
 Watsonville, United States

San Salvador

 Doha, Qatar
 Dubai, United Arab Emirates
 Guadalajara, Mexico
 Laval, Canada
 Lima, Peru
 Los Angeles, United States
 Madrid, Spain
 Monterrey, Mexico
 Panama City, Panama
 Seville, Spain
 Taipei, Taiwan
 Washington, D.C., United States

Santa Ana
 Miramar, United States

Santa Tecla

 Coral Gables, United States
 Heredia, Costa Rica
 Granada, Nicaragua
 Nesodden, Norway
 Senica, Slovakia
 Tegucigalpa, Honduras

Segundo Montes
 Cleveland, United States

Sonsonate
 Segrate, Italy

Soyapango
 Manizales, Colombia

Suchitoto
 Prescott, United States

Tecoluca
 Terrassa, Spain

Las Vueltas
 Windsor, Canada

Yucuaiquín
 Somerville, United States

Zaragoza
 Zaragoza, Spain

Greenland
Aasiaat
 Skive, Denmark

Ilulissat

 Fredericia, Denmark
 Fuglafjørður, Faroe Islands
 Hafnarfjörður, Iceland

Qasigiannguit
 Skive, Denmark

Qeqqata

 Esbjerg, Denmark
 Fjarðabyggð, Iceland
 Frederikshavn, Denmark 
 Iqaluit, Canada
 Klaksvík, Faroe Islands

Sermersooq

 Aalborg, Denmark
 Gentofte, Denmark
 Kópavogur, Iceland

Upernavik
 Odense, Denmark

Grenada
St. George's

 Foshan, China
 Hackney, England, United Kingdom

Guatemala
Aguacatán
 Moss, Norway

Almolonga
 Mission, United States

Amatitlán
 Gzhel, Russia

Antigua Guatemala

 Benito Juárez, Mexico
 Colonia del Sacramento, Uruguay
 Coral Gables, United States
 Metepec, Mexico
 Oaxaca de Juárez, Mexico
 Puebla, Mexico
 Saint-Pierre, Martinique, France
 Tlaquepaque, Mexico
 Uruapan, Mexico
 Zapopan, Mexico

Ayutla
 Ángel Albino Corzo, Mexico

La Blanca
 Ángel Albino Corzo, Mexico

Catarina
 Ángel Albino Corzo, Mexico

Chiquimula
 Port Huron, United States

Coatepeque
 Ángel Albino Corzo, Mexico

Esquipulas
 Moroleón, Mexico

Ipala
 Riverdale Park, United States

Guatemala City

 Doral, United States
 Hollywood, United States
 Madrid, Spain
 Monterrey, Mexico
 Providence, United States
 Saltillo, Mexico
 San Juan, Puerto Rico
 Santa Cruz de Tenerife, Spain
 Taipei, Taiwan

La Libertad

 Palenque, Mexico
 San Cristóbal de las Casas, Mexico

Malacatán
 Ángel Albino Corzo, Mexico

Ocós
 Ángel Albino Corzo, Mexico

Patzún
 Fredrikstad, Norway

Quetzaltenango

 Campeche, Mexico
 Chiapa de Corzo, Mexico
 Livermore, United States
 San Cristóbal de Las Casas, Mexico
 Santa Fe, Spain
 Santa María Huatulco, Mexico
 Tapachula, Mexico
 Tromsø, Norway
 Turin, Italy
 Veracruz, Mexico

Salcajá
 Trenton, United States

San Juan Comalapa
 Göttingen (district), Germany

San Martín Sacatepéquez
 Fredrikstad, Norway

Tejutla
 Chiapa de Corzo, Mexico

Zacapa
 Tainan, Taiwan

Zaragoza
 Zaragoza, Spain

Haiti
Aquin
 Delray Beach, United States

Arcahaie
 North Miami, United States

Borgne
 Honeoye Falls, United States

Cap-Haïtien

 Columbia, United States
 Fort Lauderdale, United States
 New Orleans, United States
 Portland, United States 

Carrefour
 Granby, Canada

Les Cayes

 Boynton Beach, United States
 Cambridge, United States

La Chapelle
 North Miami Beach, United States

Delmas
 North Miami, United States

Gonaïves
 North Miami Beach, United States

Jacmel
 Gainesville, United States

Petit-Goâve
 Miami-Dade County, United States

Port-au-Prince

 Miami, United States
 Montevideo, Uruguay

Saint-Louis-du-Nord
 North Miami, United States

Tabarre

 North Miami Beach, United States
 La Plata, Argentina

Honduras
La Ceiba
 Broken Arrow, United States

Copán Ruinas
 Cusco, Peru

Patuca
 L'Ametlla de Mar, Spain

San Pedro Sula

 Duisburg, Germany
 Medellín, Colombia
 North Miami Beach, United States
 Taichung, Taiwan
 Zapopan, Mexico

Santa Bárbara
 Freeport, United States

Tegucigalpa

 Belo Horizonte, Brazil
 Guadalajara, Mexico
 Madrid, Spain
 Mexico City, Mexico
 New Orleans, United States
 Santa Tecla, El Salvador
 Taipei, Taiwan

Trujillo
 Trujillo, Spain

Yoro
 Zaragoza, Spain

Jamaica
Clarendon
 Haringey, England, United Kingdom

Kingston

 Birmingham, United States 
 Coventry, England, United Kingdom
 Gibraltar, Gibraltar
 Groton, United States
 Guadalajara, Mexico
 Kalamazoo, United States
 Miami-Dade County, United States
 New London, United States
 Salvador, Brazil
 Shenzhen, China
 Windhoek, Namibia
 Yantai, China

Montego Bay

 Atlanta, United States
 Hangzhou, China

Morant Bay
 Hartford, United States

Ocho Rios

 Oakland, United States
 Ostróda, Poland
 Owen Sound, Canada

Portmore
 Lakeland, United States

Saint Ann
 Buffalo, United States

Saint Elizabeth
 Redditch, England, United Kingdom

Westmoreland
 Tottori Prefecture, Japan

Mexico

Nicaragua

Panama
Colón
 Santos, Brazil

Panama City

 Barranquilla, Colombia
 Caracas, Venezuela
 Charleston, United States
 Fort Lauderdale, United States
 Guadalajara, Mexico
 Imabari, Japan
 Incheon, South Korea
 Kaohsiung, Taiwan
 Liverpool, England, United Kingdom
 Madrid, Spain
 Medellín, Colombia
 San Diego, United States
 San Salvador, El Salvador
 Taipei, Taiwan

Santiago de Veraguas
 Baoding, China

Puerto Rico
Caguas

 Belén, Costa Rica
 Santa Fe, Spain

Comerío
 Callao, Peru

Mayagüez

 Callao, Peru
 Quiroga, Mexico

Ponce
 Zaragoza, Spain

Quebradillas
 Callao, Peru

San Germán
 Callao, Peru

San Juan

 Cádiz, Spain
 Cartagena, Colombia
 Dubai, United Arab Emirates
 Guatemala City, Guatemala
 Honolulu, United States
 Jacksonville, United States
 Killeen, United States
 Madrid, Spain
 San Juan, Philippines
 Santiago, Dominican Republic

Yauco
 Tequila, Mexico

Saint Lucia
Castries
 Taipei, Taiwan

Sint Maarten
Sint Maarten
 Tallahassee, United States

Trinidad and Tobago
Arima
 Haringey, England, United Kingdom

Port of Spain

 Atlanta, United States
 Georgetown, Guyana
 Lagos, Nigeria
 Morne-à-l'Eau, Guadeloupe, France
 Richmond, United States
 St. Catharines, Canada

San Fernando
 La Trinité, Martinique, France

United States

References

North America